Terre-de-Bas is a commune in the French overseas department and region of Guadeloupe, in the Lesser Antilles. Terre-de-Bas is made up of Terre-de-Bas Island and several uninhabited islands and islets in the group of Les Saintes islands, to the southwest of Guadeloupe's mainland.

Education
Public preschools and primary schools:
 Ecole primaire Petites Anses
 Ecole maternelle Grande Anse

See also
Communes of the Guadeloupe department

References

Communes of Îles des Saintes
Communes of Guadeloupe